Portchester Community School is a mixed comprehensive community school for 11- to 16-year-olds in Portchester, England.

As of January 2015, the date of the last Ofsted inspection, the school has been rated overall as 'good'.

References

External links 
 , the school's official website
 Direct.gov Portchester Community School overview
  DfES Achievement and Attainment Tables 2006 for Portchester Community School

1939 establishments in England
Secondary schools in Hampshire
Educational institutions established in 1939
Borough of Fareham
Community schools in Hampshire